The Oberalpstock or Piz Tgietschen is a mountain in the Glarus Alps between the cantons of Uri and Graubünden. Its massif separates the valleys of Maderanertal (Uri) and Surselva near Sedrun (Graubündnen).

The Oberalpstock is the highest summit of the Glarus Alps west of the Tödi, and also the highest mountain in the canton of Uri east of the Reuss.

See also
List of mountains of Graubünden
List of mountains of Uri
List of most isolated mountains of Switzerland

References

 Swisstopo maps

External links
 Oberalpstock on Summitpost

Mountains of Switzerland
Mountains of the Alps
Alpine three-thousanders
Mountains of Graubünden
Mountains of the canton of Uri
Graubünden–Uri border
Tujetsch